Dewan Sabbir (born 3 October 1992) is a Bangladeshi first-class cricketer who plays for Dhaka Division.

See also
 List of Dhaka Division cricketers

References

External links
 

1992 births
Living people
Bangladeshi cricketers
Dhaka Division cricketers
Place of birth missing (living people)